Amoria exoptanda, common name the desirable volute, is a species of sea snail, a marine gastropod mollusk in the family Volutidae, the volutes.

Description
The length of the shell varies between 85 mm and 110 mm.

Distribution
This marine species occurs off South and West Australia.

References

 Bail P. & Limpus A. (2001) The genus Amoria. In: G.T. Poppe & K. Groh (eds) A conchological iconography. Hackenheim: Conchbooks. 50 pp., 93 pls.

External links
 

Volutidae
Gastropods described in 1849